Cheshmeh Bid (also Romanized as Cheshmeh Bīd; also known as Cheshmeh Bīdeh) is a village in Petergan Rural District, Central District, Zirkuh County, South Khorasan Province, Iran. At the 2006 census, its population was 263, in 59 families.

References 

Populated places in Zirkuh County